Wendy Jo Allen Hauser (born April 5, 1982) is an American, former collegiate All-American, left-handed hitting professional All-Star softball pitcher and former coach. She played for two NCAA Division I teams: Ohio State Buckeyes 2001-02 and the Arizona Wildcats from 2003-04. She was named the Big Ten Conference Player of the Year in 2002 and a NFCA First-Team All-American at Arizona in 2004. She was later selected 21st in the National Pro Fastpitch draft and played in 2004, being named an All-Star. She is a softball record holder for Ohio State.

Career
Allen attended Valley View High School from 1996 to 1997, and Moreno Valley High School from 1997 to 2000. She then attended Ohio State University, and played varsity softball for the Buckeyes from fall 2000 to 2002. She was named a Second Team All-American as a sophomore, and set a then school career record in batting average (.375) for her two years of play. In the fall of 2002 she transferred to the University of Arizona where she competed for the varsity softball team from 2002 to 2004. Allen would leave ranking 10th in the NCAA all-time for career doubles.

In the summer of 2004 she was drafted to play on the now defunct Arizona Heat.

After graduating with a Bachelor of Science in Business from the Eller College of Management, she played the 2006 season in Caronno Pertusella, Italy for the A.B. Caronno Rheavendors.

In 2006, Allen joined the University of Redlands coaching staff, first as a volunteer coach and then later as a graduate assistant. In 2008 she graduated with a Master of Arts in Education: Higher Education.

Career stats

Ohio State Buckeyes & Arizona Wildcats

NPF Arizona Heat

Italian League

References

External links
 

1982 births
Living people
American softball coaches
Arizona Wildcats softball players
Ohio State Buckeyes softball players
Redlands Bulldogs softball coaches
People from Moreno Valley, California
Sportspeople from Riverside County, California
Softball players from California